The Frances Pomeroy Naismith Award was an annual college basketball award in the United States intended to honor shorter-than-average players who excelled on the court despite their size. The award, named in honor of James Naismith's daughter-in-law, was established for men in 1969 and for women in 1984. The men's award was presented to the nation's most outstanding senior who is 6 ft 0 in (1.83 m) or shorter, while the women's award was presented to the top senior who is 5 ft 8 in (1.73 m) or shorter. The men's award was selected by a panel from the National Association of Basketball Coaches (NABC), while the women's was selected by the Women's Basketball Coaches Association (WBCA). The award was discontinued  following the 2013–14 season.

The Frances Pomeroy Naismith Award was restricted to players who competed in NCAA Division I competition, but in the past it was open to all NCAA levels. For the men's winners, John Rinka from Kenyon College (1970), Mike Scheib from Susquehanna University (1978) and Jerry Johnson from Florida Southern College (1988) were winners from NCAA Division II, Division III, and Division II, respectively. For the women's winners, Julie Dabrowski of New Hampshire College (now Southern New Hampshire University) (1990) and Amy Dodrill (1995) and Angie Arnold (1998), both from Johns Hopkins University, were also winners from Division III.

Only three schools from the list of men's winners (Louisville, St. John's and UCLA) and six schools from the list of women's winners (Baylor, Connecticut, Gonzaga, Johns Hopkins, Notre Dame, and Penn State) had multiple award winners. Of these programs, the only one with winners in consecutive seasons is the Louisville men's program (Peyton Siva in 2013 and Russ Smith in 2014). Six other schools have had winners of both the men's and women's awards: California, Eastern Michigan, NC State, Purdue, Virginia, and Wake Forest.

Key

Winners

References

External links
 WBCA Awards - WBCA.org

Awards established in 1969 
Awards established in 1984 
Awards disestablished in 2014
College basketball trophies and awards in the United States